Constituencies are used for elections in Belgium.

Federal parliament 

 Antwerp (Chamber of Representatives constituency)
 Brussels (Chamber of Representatives constituency)
 East Flanders (Chamber of Representatives constituency)
 Flemish Brabant (Chamber of Representatives constituency)
 Hainaut (Chamber of Representatives constituency)
 Liège (Chamber of Representatives constituency)
 Limburg (Chamber of Representatives constituency)
 Luxembourg (Chamber of Representatives constituency)
 Namur (Chamber of Representatives constituency)
 Walloon Brabant (Chamber of Representatives constituency)
 West Flanders (Chamber of Representatives constituency)

European parliament 

 Dutch-speaking electoral college
 French-speaking electoral college
 German-speaking electoral college

References 

Chamber of Representatives (Belgium)
Parliamentary constituencies in Belgium
Belgium
Belgium politics-related lists